The Seal of Quezon City is one of the official symbols of Quezon City. The current seal used by the city, adopted in 1975, is a triangular seal with the Quezon Memorial Shrine as its primary element.

History

Historical seal (1948-1975)
An earlier seal was conceptualized when Quezon City was instated as the national capital in 1948 through Republic Act No. 333 issued by then President Elpidio Quirino. The seal was made within the same year by the Philippine Heraldry Commission and was attested by then Executive Secretary Emilio Abello. The seal featured a design of a shield divided diagonally. One side of the shield was in red and the other was in blue. At its center is the profile of city founder and former President, Manuel L. Quezon in an oval frame overlaid. The element is enclosed by a circular ring with the text "Lungsod Quezon" and "Sagisag na Opisyal" at the upper and bottom portion of the ring respectively in all caps.

Current seal (1975-present)
Acting Cultural Officer Francisco B. Alvarez suggested a redesign of the seal in a letter to then City Mayor Norberto Amoranto on August 1, 1974 describing the design and symbolism of the 1948 seal as "archaic". A design proposal was made which was endorsed by Amoranto to Luciano V. Aquino, an architect. Aquino approved the design after adding some modifications to it himself. Amoranto sent the design to the Philippine Heraldry Commission and the Office of the President for its approval. Galo Ocampo, Technical Adviser on Heraldry recommended the design which led to the seal's approval. Assistant Executive Secretary Roberto V. Reyes signed the approval. The City Council of Quezon City officially adopted the seal through the passage of Resolution No. 10320 S-75 on February 3, 1975.

Description

The current seal which was adopted on 1975 has a form of an equilateral triangle divided into blue and red portions. The seal features the Quezon Memorial Shrine at its center, the lamp of knowledge on the blue field and a gavel on the red field. At the upper sides of the seal border is the word "Lungsod Quezon" in all caps. 

The text inscribed at the bottom of the seal border also in all caps was revised at least three times. Initially the text was "Punong Bayan ng Pilipinas" until the status of Quezon City as capital of the country was restored to Manila pursuant to Presidential Decree No. 940 of Ferdinand Marcos issued on May 7, 1976. After Quezon City was stripped of its capital city status, the text was changed to "Republika ng Pilipinas", then to "Kalakhang Manila" before this was change to "Pilipinas".

Additionally the stars of the seal is meant to symbolize Manuel L. Quezon's "greatness", the gavel his "incomparable leadership" and the lamp of knowledge is meant to signify the city's educational development. The colors of the seal are patterned after the Philippine flag.

References

Seal
Quezon City
Quezon City
Quezon City
Quezon City